Lamont is an unincorporated community in the town of Lamont, Lafayette County, Wisconsin, United States.

James U. Goodman (1872-1953), farmer, businessman, and politician, lived in the town of Lamont; he served chairman of theLamont Town Board.

Notes

Unincorporated communities in Lafayette County, Wisconsin
Unincorporated communities in Wisconsin